Creighton R. Coleman (1912-1992) was a judge and a member of the Michigan Senate.

He served in the United States Navy during World War II and was elected to the Senate in 1949. He was an unsuccessful candidate for Congress in 1956, losing to the incumbent August E. Johansen in the primary, and left the Senate that year. Four years later, he became a circuit judge, serving on the bench for 22 years.

Coleman was the assistant chief of the decartelization branch of the economics division in the Office of Military Government, United States in Germany after the war.

He was married to Mary S. Coleman, a jurist in her own right and a former chief justice of the Michigan Supreme Court.

References

1912 births
1992 deaths
United States Navy personnel of World War II
Michigan state court judges
Michigan state senators
20th-century American judges
20th-century American politicians